Wieboldt Stores, Inc., also known as Wieboldt's, did business as a Chicago general retailer between 1883 and 1987. It was founded in 1883 by storekeeper William A. Wieboldt. The flagship location was at One North State Street Store in Chicago.

History
Wieboldt's operated several Chicago neighborhood stores; its flagship store at State Street and Lake Street in Downtown Chicago, Ashland Avenue and Madison Street, Milwaukee Avenue and Paulina Street, 7601 S. Cicero Avenue (Ford City Mall), Lincoln Avenue and McCormick (Lincoln Village), and 63rd Street and Halsted Street. There were also several suburban locations including stores in Evanston, Lombard (Yorktown Mall), Norridge (Harlem Irving Plaza), Carpentersville (Meadowdale), Matteson (Lincoln Mall), Waukegan (Lakehurst Mall), Joliet (Jefferson Square), Mt. Prospect (Randhurst Village), and Oak Park, Illinois.  In 1961, Wieboldt's acquired the failed Mandel Brothers store on State Street as well as a smaller branch store in Lincoln Village shopping center. By the 1970s Wieboldt's operated more than 15 stores in the Chicagoland area. 

Wievildt's celebrated 100 years in business in April 1983. An advertisement in the Chicago Sun-Times stated "Building for a New Tomorrow". "An important part of Chicago's past, we look to the future with confidence and enthusiasm. The dream of yesterday is the promise of tomorrow. Chicago, Wieboldt's.  Tomorrow begins today."

During the 1980s, the chain had trouble staying profitable, eventually leading the company into bankruptcy in 1987. The chain never recovered and all the stores closed.

Promotions
Wieboldt's was known for giving S&H Green Stamps with purchases, and there were redemption centers located in their stores.  The State Street location included a particularly large redemption center.  Customers would choose items based on the number of stamps redeemed.  In the 1940s and 1950s, and then again in the mid-80s, they sponsored a broadcast program featuring The Cinnamon Bear: stories of how Cinnamon Bear takes his young friends on a trip to maybe land in search of the Silver Star.  A stuffed teddy bear version could be purchased from the stores for $2.98 in the 1950s, and Santa would give out free Cinnamon Bear buttons to children visiting Santa.  The program was first produced by Glen Heisch and Elizabeth Heisch in 1937 in Hollywood and syndicated around the country.  Wieboldt's had a number of memorable radio ads on radio during Chicago Cubs games in the early 1960s, featuring announcers Jack Quinlan and Lou Boudreau. Some of them can be heard at https://www.youtube.com/watch?v=tgHwHsA6YiQ.

Slogans
 "Where You Buy With Confidence"
 "The Values Speak For Themselves"

References

1986 Annual Report

External links
Encyclopedia of Chicago article
Jazz Age Chicago - W.A. Wieboldt Co.
Photos of a Wieboldt's store at Lakehurst Mall 

Defunct department stores based in Chicago
Retail companies established in 1883
Retail companies disestablished in 1986
Defunct companies based in Chicago
1883 establishments in Illinois
1986 disestablishments in Illinois